Parrari or Parari was a terrorist outfit founded by Sher Mohammad Marri in the 1962. The outfit was responsible for series of attacks against Pakistani civilians and security forces. The outfit continued its attacks until 1969, when a ceasefire was negotiated. Some member then formed BPLF.

The outfit is currently inactive.

References

Baloch nationalist militant groups
National liberation movements
Paramilitary organisations based in Pakistan
Balochistan
Rebel groups in Pakistan